Marion Mott-McGrath (born 6 February 1940), née McGrath, is an Australian chess player. She is a four-time winner of the Australian Women's Chess Championship (1966, 1969, 1976, 1980).

Biography
From the 1960s to the 1980s Marion Mott-McGrath was one of the leading Australian women's chess players. Marion Mott-McGrath is an Australian chess player, who most often won Australian Women's Chess Championships. In 1966, she first time won Australian Women's Chess Championship, but in 1980 Marion Mott-McGrath is repeated this success in fourth time. In 1967, she participated at Women's World Chess Championship Candidates Tournament in Subotica and ranked 16th place.

Marion Mott-McGrath played for Australia in the Women's Chess Olympiads:
 In 1972, at second board in the 5th Chess Olympiad (women) in Skopje (+2, =3, -3),
 In 1976, at first board in the 7th Chess Olympiad (women) in Haifa (+1, =3, -5),
 In 1978, at third board in the 8th Chess Olympiad (women) in Buenos Aires (+4, =3, -4),
 In 1980, at first board in the 9th Chess Olympiad (women) in Valletta (+2, =6, -3),
 In 1984, at third board in the 26th Chess Olympiad (women) in Thessaloniki (+3, =2, -5),
 In 1986, at first reserve board in the 27th Chess Olympiad (women) in Dubai (+2, =4, -3).

References

External links

Marion Mott-McGrath chess games at 365Chess.com

1940 births
Australian female chess players
Chess Olympiad competitors
Living people